12 Corazones: Rumbo al Altar (12 Hearts: Heading to the Altar) is a one-hour, weekend spin-off of Telemundo’s weekday daytime game show 12 Corazones. Hosted by Penélope Menchaca, the show features 12 engaged partners (6 couples) competing for weekly prizes to jump-start their lives together and a chance to win the grand prize of a dream wedding.

Reference

External Link 
IMDB Page
2000s American game shows
2010s American game shows
2006 American television series debuts
2012 American television series endings
Telemundo original programming
American dating and relationship reality television series